William Havard (1710?–1778), was a British actor and dramatist. 

Havard appeared at Goodman's Fields Theatre, 1730–1737, and then at the Drury Lane Theatre until retirement in 1769. He generally  played secondary parts; depreciated in Rosciad. He also appeared in his own plays, King Charles I at Lincoln's Inn Fields, 1737; Regulus Drury Lane, 1744; and The Elopement Drury Lane, 1763.

Selected roles
 Montesini in The Parricide (1736)
 Rosebrand in The Independent Patriot (1737)
 Talthybius in Agamemnon (1738)
 Hartly in The Coffee House (1738)
 Achmet in Mustapha (1739)
 Young Freeman in Love the Cause and Cure of Grief (1743)
 Decius in Regulus (1744)
 Young Whimsey in The Astrologer (1744)
 Rodolpho in Tancred and Sigismunda (1745)
 Bellamy in The Suspicious Husband (1747)
 Colonel Raymond in The Foundling (1748)
 Abdalla, An Officer in Irene (1749)
 Arnold in Edward the Black Prince (1750)
 Amphares in Agis (1758)
 Timurkan in The Orphan of China (1759)
 Megistus in Zenobia (1768)

Notes

References

Further reading

1710 births
1778 deaths
English male stage actors
18th-century English male actors